Negoi is a commune in Dolj County, Oltenia, Romania with a population of 4,286 people. It is composed of a single village, Negoi. It also included Catane and Catanele Noi villages until 2004, when they were split off to form Catane Commune.

References

Communes in Dolj County
Localities in Oltenia